Durga Chew-Bose is a writer based in Brooklyn, New York. Her first book, Too Much and Not the Mood, was published in 2017.

Early life
Chew-Bose was born in Montreal; her parents are from Kolkata. Her parents named her after the character Durga from the Satyajit Ray-directed film Pather Panchali. Chew-Bose moved to the United States at 17 to attend boarding school in New Mexico for two years. She went on to attend Sarah Lawrence College and spent a year at the University of Oxford.

Career
Chew-Bose has written for publications including The Guardian, BuzzFeed, The Hairpin, Rolling Stone, GQ, The New Inquiry, n+1, Interview, Paper, Hazlitt, and This Recording. In Nylon, Kristen Iverson described Chew-Bose as "one of our most gifted, insightful essayists and critics"; in The Guardian, Sarah Galo said, "If millennials have an intelligentsia, Brooklyn-based writer Durga Chew-Bose is a member of it[, writing] thoughtful long reads on identity and culture that command readers’ attention."

Chew-Bose has also taught writing at Sarah Lawrence College. She has listed Agnès Varda and Wong Kar-wai among her important influences.

Too Much and Not the Mood
Taking its title from one of Virginia Woolf's diary entries from 1931, Chew-Bose's Too Much and Not the Mood is an essay collection describing "the complications of growing up and establishing oneself...what it means to be a brown girl in a white world and 'the beautiful dilemma of being first-generation' Canadian."

Critics have emphasized the stylistic innovation of Chew-Bose's writing in the collection. Naming Too Much and Not the Mood to a Bustle list of "15 Most Anticipated Feminist Book Releases Of 2017," Sadie L. Trombetta described the book as a "collection of essays, letters, prose, and poetry." Listing Too Much and Not the Mood among the 25 "Most Exciting Book Releases for 2017", Maris Kreizman said in New York Magazine'''s Vulture, "If you admire Maggie Nelson’s ability to combine the personal and the academic into a thrilling new art form, Durga Chew-Bose will be your next favorite writer." Publishers Weekly said of the collection, "Twists in language and heady cultural references elevate Chew-Bose’s debut above the recent crop of personal essay collections by young writers."

Writers of Color
In 2015, Chew-Bose cofounded the website Writers of Color With Buster Bylander Jazmine Hughes and Vijith Assar. The site is a searchable database of contemporary writers of color.

 Publications 
 

References

External links
 
 Interview with Durga Chew-Bose on BuzzFeed podcast Another Round'' (March 24, 2015)

Living people
21st-century American essayists
American women essayists
1986 births
21st-century American women writers